Ministry of Infrastructure is a government ministry of Slovenia. Its head office is in Ljubljana.

References

External links
 Ministry of Infrastructure
 Ministry of Infrastructure 

Government ministries of Slovenia
Infrastructure ministries